Oberboihingen is a municipality in the district of Esslingen in Baden-Württemberg in southern Germany.

Geography
It is located 20 km southeast of Stuttgart on the railway line between Stuttgart and Tübingen.

Curiosities
At the station, there was the last hand-operated level crossing in Baden-Württemberg.

References

External links
Official Web site

Esslingen (district)
Populated places on the Neckar basin
Populated riverside places in Germany